The 2011 FIBA Europe Under-16 Championship for Women was the 23rd edition of the FIBA Europe Under-16 Championship for Women. 16 teams participated in the competition, held in Cagliari, Italy, from 11 to 21 August 2011.

Teams

  Winners, 2010 FIBA Europe Under-16 Championship for Women Division B

  Runners-up, 2010 FIBA Europe Under-16 Championship for Women Division B

Group stages

Preliminary round
In this round, the sixteen teams were allocated in four groups of four teams each. The top three qualified for the qualifying round. The last team of each group played for the 13th–16th place in the Classification Games.

Group A

Group B

Group C

Group D

Qualifying round
The twelve teams remaining were allocated in two groups of six teams each. The four top teams advanced to the quarterfinals. The last two teams of each group played for the 9th–12th place.

Group E

Group F

Classification round
The last teams of each group in the preliminary round will compete in this Classification Round. The four teams will play in one group. The last two teams will be relegated to Division B for the next season.

Group G

Knockout round

Championship

Quarterfinals

Semifinals

Bronze medal game

Final

5th–8th playoffs

5th–8th semifinals

7th place playoff

5th place playoff

9th–12th playoffs

9th–12th semifinals

11th place playoff

9th place playoff

Final standings

Awards

All-Tournament Team

 Leticia Romero
 Maria Arrojo
 Hind Ben Abdelkader
 Cecilia Zandalasini
 Hulya Coklar

External links
Official Site

References

2011
2011–12 in European women's basketball
2011–12 in Italian basketball
International youth basketball competitions hosted by Italy
International women's basketball competitions hosted by Italy
Sport in Cagliari
2011 in youth sport